Joël Nigiono (born 8 January 1952) is a Monegasque sports shooter. He competed in the men's 50 metre free pistol event at the 1984 Summer Olympics.

References

1952 births
Living people
Monegasque male sport shooters
Olympic shooters of Monaco
Shooters at the 1984 Summer Olympics
Place of birth missing (living people)